The men's aerials at the 2007 Asian Winter Games was held on 1 February 2007 at Beida Lake Skiing Resort in Jilin, China.

Schedule
All times are China Standard Time (UTC+08:00)

Results
Legend
DNS — Did not start

 Kotaro Kurata was awarded bronze because of no three-medal sweep per country rule.

References

Results

External links
Official website

Men's aerials